Fallowfield is a station on the Port Authority of Allegheny County's light rail network, located in the Beechview neighborhood of Pittsburgh, Pennsylvania. The high level stop is located at the end of Broadway Avenue, built where the tracks transition from a street to a private right-of-way. The station serves a densely populated residential area through which bus service is limited because of the hilly terrain.  Although a high level stop there is no fare booth, as such passengers must board or alight from the first car of a two car train.

References

External links

Port Authority T Stations Listings

Port Authority of Allegheny County stations
Railway stations in the United States opened in 1987
Red Line (Pittsburgh)